Lynnwood Glen is a suburb of the city of Pretoria, South Africa. It is a well-developed area, lying to the east of the city centre.

When it was first established in 1967, it was the most eastern suburb of Pretoria, but the city has since considerably expanded eastwards and southwards.

Together with Brooklyn and Menlo Park, it was most likely named after American counterparts. Today, these suburbs are known as the old east and boast to have some of the city's most high-end residential properties. St. Alban's College, a prestige boarding and day school for boys, is located in the centre of the suburb.

References

Suburbs of Pretoria